Jalen Anthony Rose (born January 30, 1973) is an American sports analyst and former professional basketball player. In college, he was a member of the University of Michigan Wolverines' "Fab Five" (along with Chris Webber, Juwan Howard, Jimmy King, and Ray Jackson) that reached the 1992 and 1993 NCAA Men's Division I Basketball Championship games as both freshmen and sophomores.

Rose played in the National Basketball Association (NBA) as a small forward for six teams, most notably alongside Reggie Miller on the Indiana Pacers team that made three consecutive Eastern Conference finals, and reached the 2000 NBA Finals. He retired in 2007 with a career average of 14.3 points, 3.8 assists and 3.5 rebounds per game.

Rose is a sports analyst for ABC and ESPN.  He is an analyst on NBA Countdown and Get Up!, and he was co-host of the ESPN talk show, Jalen & Jacoby, with co-host David Jacoby until late 2022. He is also the founder of the Jalen Rose Leadership Academy and the author of The New York Times best-seller Got to Give the People What They Want and producer of the ESPN documentary The Fab Five.

Early life
Rose's biological father Jimmy Walker was a No. 1 overall draft pick in the NBA who started in the backcourt alongside Jerry West in the 1972 NBA All-Star Game. Although they eventually spoke several times over the phone, Rose never met his father in person. Walker died in July 2007 of lung cancer.

Rose's mother, Jeanne, named him from a combination of his father's name, James, and his uncle's name, Leonard. As a result of Rose's prominence in the NCAA and NBA, Jalen became one of the most popular names for African-American boys born in the 1990s and early 2000s. A number of notable American athletes who began play in the 2010s are named Jalen, after Rose, including Jalen Hurts, Jalen Mayfield, Jalen Green, Jalen Suggs, and Jaylen Waddle. In 2021, there were 32 players with some variation of the name Jalen on rosters in the NBA, NFL, and other North American professional sports, with an additional 80 who played men's college basketball.

Basketball career

College basketball career

As a star at Southwestern High School in Detroit, where he was teammates with future NBA players Voshon Lenard and Howard Eisley, Rose obtained a high profile and can even be seen at a high school All-American camp in the documentary film Hoop Dreams. Rose attended the University of Michigan where the Wolverines reached two NCAA Finals games in 1992 and 1993, finishing as national runners up both times. Rose was a part of Wolverines coach Steve Fisher's legendary 1991 recruiting class, dubbed the "Fab Five". He led the Fab Five in scoring his freshman year, averaging 17.6 points per game, and set the school freshman scoring record with 597 total points. Aside from being the most outspoken of the Fab Five, Rose was also their small forward and leader. While he did not win an NCAA title, he racked up over 1700 points, 400 rebounds, 400 assists, and 100 steals. At 6-8 and playing as a versatile point guard, some reporters started comparing Rose to his schoolboy idol Magic Johnson. Of the players called before the grand jury (Robert Traylor, Webber, Rose, Maurice Taylor, and Louis Bullock) in the University of Michigan basketball scandal, Rose was the only one not listed as having received large amounts of money.

NBA career

Rose played for six different NBA teams, forging a solid pro career after skipping his senior season at Michigan. He was selected 13th overall by the Denver Nuggets in the 1994 NBA draft. After two years with Denver, he was traded to the Indiana Pacers, along with Reggie Williams and a future first round draft pick, for Mark Jackson, Ricky Pierce, and a 1st round draft pick.

Despite his successes in Indiana, he was not readily accepted early on. Rose frequently logged DNPCDs (Did Not Play – Coach's Decision) under Coach Larry Brown. Rose also often spoke out about the fact he was being used as a backup two-guard and small forward over his preference, which was point guard. It was not until Larry Bird took over coaching duties did Rose finally begin to blossom, eventually realizing he was most effective at small forward.

As a member of the Indiana Pacers, Rose helped the team get back on its feet after a disastrous 1996–97 season and make it to three consecutive Eastern Conference Finals appearances. Rose became the first player in eight years other than Reggie Miller to lead the Pacers in scoring in the 1999–2000 season when he averaged 18.2 points per game for the eventual Eastern Conference Champions, winning the NBA Most Improved Player Award in the process, the first time in Pacers history. After helping lead his team to the 2000 NBA Finals, Rose went on to average 25 points per game in the six game series, including a 32-point effort in a game five win. However, the Pacers lost the series to the Los Angeles Lakers. This playoff series is also remembered for Rose intentionally placing his foot underneath Kobe Bryant in game 2, while Bryant was landing back to the ground after shooting a jump shot, in an effort to cause Bryant injury (which Rose later admitted to intentionally doing).  Bryant would miss Game 3 of the series due to an injury after landing on Rose's foot.

During the 2001–02 season, Rose was traded to the Chicago Bulls along with Travis Best, Norman Richardson, and a future second round draft pick in exchange for Brad Miller, Ron Mercer, Ron Artest and Kevin Ollie.

After 16 games in the 2003–04 season, Rose was traded to the Toronto Raptors, along with power forwards Donyell Marshall and Lonny Baxter.

On February 3, 2006, midway through the 2005–06 season, he was traded, along with a first-round draft pick, and an undisclosed sum of cash (believed to be around $3 million), to the New York Knicks for Antonio Davis, where he was reunited with Larry Brown, his coach for one year with the Indiana Pacers. The motivation behind this trade was apparently to free up cap space (Rose earned close to $16 million a year) and to allow the Raptors to acquire an experienced center who could relieve some of Chris Bosh's rebounding duties. Rose's final game and contribution for the Raptors was a home win against the Sacramento Kings, where he scored the winning basket in overtime.

On November 3, 2006, Rose announced he would sign with the Suns. On November 7, it was officially announced that Rose had signed a $1.5 million one-year deal with Phoenix. Rose retired from the NBA in 2007 with a career average of 14.3 points, 3.8 assists and 3.5 rebounds per game.

Post-NBA career and broadcasting

Rose worked as a Sideline Reporter for the 2006 NBA Playoffs for TNT. Since his retirement in 2007, Rose has worked at ABC/ESPN, first as an analyst on SportsCenter and in 2012 he became one of the hosts for NBA Countdown. Rose has also worked on ESPN's Grantland.

Rose is the owner of Three Tier Entertainment, an independent, Los Angeles based management and production company. Created in 2007, Three Tier Entertainment develops television and film projects and also manages talent including directors, actors and screenplay writers. In 2011, he produced the ESPN documentary The Fab Five. The Fab Five earned a 2.1 rating to become ESPNʼs highest rated documentary according to the Nielsen Company, despite sparking controversy that led to a series of media exchanges between members of the press, Michigan Wolverines men's basketball players and Duke Blue Devils men's basketball players.

In 2015, Rose released Got to Give the People What They Want, a book about his personal life story. It is a New York Times Bestseller and made the list of Michigan Notable Books from 2016. He co-hosted Jalen & Jacoby, a national US sports radio show on ESPN Radio, with David Jacoby, until late 2022. Since April 2018, Rose has been a guest analyst of Get Up!, a three-hour morning sports talk show on ESPN.

Rose also has a multi-platform partnership with the New York Post where he hosts a podcast and weekly column under the name Renaissance Man.

NBA career statistics

Player profile
A left-handed player, Rose was known to have a smooth and versatile offensive game, and was particularly gifted as a scorer from the perimeter or the post. Rose was used throughout his career at three different positions. He began his career as a point guard for the Denver Nuggets and became a shooting guard/small forward for the Indiana Pacers. He then returned to the point guard position briefly with the Toronto Raptors. However, during his career he was most effective as a small forward or swingman. Rose was also a good passer, especially for his height, and Indiana often employed him as a point forward. Not known for his defense, Rose's best moment defensively came during the 1997–1998 season, when Rose emerged as a defensive stopper on Michael Jordan in the Eastern Conference Finals, though the Bulls pulled out the series in seven games. Rose has sometimes been regarded as a team leader, particularly under head coach Larry Bird, though he reportedly was a disruptive force in the Pacers' locker room during his feud with the coach at that time Isiah Thomas, after Thomas cut former Fab Five teammate Jimmy King on the final day to do so before the 2000–2001 season.

While in Toronto, Rose also frequently clashed with Raptors coach Sam Mitchell, who benched a struggling Jalen early in the 2005–06 season in favor of rookie Joey Graham.

In the following months, Rose increased his Player Efficiency Rating more than three points (to 13.7) while averaging 12.1 points, 2.5 assists, and 2.8 rebounds per game. However, he only shot 40.4% from the field and 27% from three-point range (including a 51.4 true shooting percentage) through 46 games.

In 2003, Rose was honored with the Professional Basketball Writers Association Magic Johnson Award. Jalen was inducted into the Detroit High School Hall of Fame in 2013 and Michigan Basketball Hall of Fame in 2017. In 2019, Rose was inducted into the American Basketball Hall of Fame in his hometown of Detroit.

Regular season 

|-
| style="text-align:left;"| 
| style="text-align:left;"| Denver
| 81 || 37 || 22.2 || .454 || .316 || .739 || 2.7 || 4.8 || .8 || .3 || 8.2
|-
| style="text-align:left;"| 
| style="text-align:left;"| Denver
| 80 || 37 || 26.7 || .480 || .296 || .690 || 3.3 || 6.2 || .7 || .5 || 10.0
|-
| style="text-align:left;"| 
| style="text-align:left;"| Indiana
| 66 || 6 || 18.0 || .456 || .292 || .750 || 1.8 || 2.3 || .9 || .3 || 7.3
|-
| style="text-align:left;"| 
| style="text-align:left;"| Indiana
| 82 || 0 || 20.8 || .478 || .342 || .728 || 2.4 || 1.9 || .7 || .2 || 9.4
|-
| style="text-align:left;"| 
| style="text-align:left;"| Indiana
| 49 || 1 || 25.3 || .403 || .262 || .791 || 3.1 || 1.9 || 1.0 || .3 || 11.1
|-
| style="text-align:left;"| 
| style="text-align:left;"| Indiana
| 80 || 80 || 37.2 || .471 || .393 || .827 || 4.8 || 4.0 || 1.1 || .6 || 18.2
|-
| style="text-align:left;"| 
| style="text-align:left;"| Indiana
| 72 || 72 || 40.9 || .457 || .339 || .828 || 5.0 || 6.0 || .9 || .6 || 20.5
|-
| style="text-align:left;"| 
| style="text-align:left;"| Indiana
| 53 || 53 || 36.5 || .444 || .356 || .839 || 4.7 || 3.7 || .8 || .5 || 18.5
|-
| style="text-align:left;"| 
| style="text-align:left;"| Chicago
| 30 || 30 || 40.5 || .470 || .370 || .839 || 4.1 || 5.3 || 1.1 || .5 || 23.8
|-
| style="text-align:left;"| 
| style="text-align:left;"| Chicago
| 82 || 82 || 40.9 || .406 || .370 || .854 || 4.3 || 4.8 || .9 || .3 || 22.1
|-
| style="text-align:left;"| 
| style="text-align:left;"| Chicago
| 16 || 14 || 33.1 || .375 || .426 || .765 || 4.0 || 3.5 || .8 || .3 || 13.3
|-
| style="text-align:left;"| 
| style="text-align:left;"| Toronto
| 50 || 50 || 39.4 || .410 || .311 || .822 || 4.0 || 5.5 || .8 || .4 || 16.2
|-
| style="text-align:left;"| 
| style="text-align:left;"| Toronto
| 81 || 65 || 33.5 || .455 || .394 || .854 || 3.4 || 2.6 || .8 || .1 || 18.5
|-
| style="text-align:left;"| 
| style="text-align:left;"| Toronto
| 46 || 22 || 26.9 || .404 || .270 || .765 || 2.8 || 2.5 || .4 || .2 || 12.0
|-
| style="text-align:left;"| 
| style="text-align:left;"| New York
| 26 || 23 || 28.7 || .460 || .491 || .812 || 3.2 || 2.6 || .4 || .1 || 12.7
|-
| style="text-align:left;"| 
| style="text-align:left;"| Phoenix
| 29 || 0 || 8.5 || .442 || .447 || .917 || 3.6|| 2.5 || .2 || .1 || 3.7
|- class="sortbottom"
| style="text-align:center;" colspan="2"| Career
| 923 || 572 || 30.3 || .443|| .355|| .801|| 3.5 || 3.8 || .8 || .3 || 14.3
|-

Playoffs 

|-
| style="text-align:left;"| 1995
| style="text-align:left;"| Denver
| 3 || 3 || 33.0 || .464 || .250 || .600 || 3.7 || 6.0 || 1.0 || .7 || 10.0
|-
| style="text-align:left;"| 1998
| style="text-align:left;"| Indiana
| 15 || 0 || 19.5 || .480 || .375 || .741 || 1.8 || 1.9 || .7 || .4 || 8.1
|-
| style="text-align:left;"| 1999
| style="text-align:left;"| Indiana
| 13 || 0 || 27.3 || .442 || .348 || .824 || 2.4 || 2.5 || 1.0 || .4 || 12.2
|-
| style="text-align:left;"| 2000
| style="text-align:left;"| Indiana
| 24 || 23 || 41.9 || .437 || .429 || .805 || 4.4 || 3.4 || .7 || .5 || 20.8
|-
| style="text-align:left;"| 2001
| style="text-align:left;"| Indiana
| 4 || 4 || 41.0 || .380 || .313 || 1.000 || 4.5 || 2.8 || 1.5 || .3 || 18.0
|-
| style="text-align:left;"| 2007
| style="text-align:left;"| Phoenix
| 1 || 0 || 9.0 || .250|| .000|| .000 || 1.0 || 2.0 || .0 || .0 || 2.0
|- class="sortbottom"
| style="text-align:center;" colspan="2"| Career
| 59 || 30 || 31.9 || .438 || .385 || .801 || 3.2 || 2.9 || .8 || .4 || 14.6

Philanthropy

In 2000, Rose established the Jalen Rose Foundation/Charitable Fund to create life-changing opportunities for underserved youth through the development of unique programs and the distribution of grants to qualified nonprofit organizations. Grants focus on education and sports and are distributed in Jalen's hometown of Detroit and in other communities in need.

Rose established the Jalen Rose Leadership Academy (JRLA) in 2011. The academy is an open enrollment, tuition free, public charter high school on the Northwest side of Detroit. The academy serves over 400 ninth through twelfth grade students and graduated its inaugural class in June 2015 – one hundred percent of the academy's graduates have gained college, trade/technical school or military acceptance. The mission is to provide a leadership-focused experience within a high-performing high school that engages and inspires Detroit area youth to achieve at the rigorous level necessary to graduate with a college degree and thrive in life. Rose serves as the President of the Board of Directors.

The Detroit News has recognized Rose with the Michiganian of the Year Award in recognition of his excellence, courage and philanthropy to uplift the metropolitan area and Michigan. In 2016, he was awarded the 11th Annual National Civil Rights Museum Sports Legacy Award for his contributions to civil and human rights, and for laying the foundation for future leaders through his career in sports in the spirit of Dr. King. Rose won the award for establishing the Jalen Rose Foundation, which creates opportunities for underprivileged youth. In addition, the Naismith Memorial Basketball Hall of Fame awarded Rose the 2016 Mannie Jackson – Basketball's Human Spirit Award.

Personal life
In 2005, Rose earned a Bachelor of Science in Management Studies from the University of Maryland University College. He remains an active supporter of his alma mater, the University of Michigan, and was seen rooting for their men's basketball team during the 2006 NIT Final Four with fellow ex-Wolverine, Maurice Taylor. He also was seen in Atlanta, Georgia for the Wolverines' 2013 NCAA National Title game.

In 2011, Rose was arrested, pleaded guilty and served time in jail for operating a motor vehicle while intoxicated in West Bloomfield Township, Michigan.

In July 2018, Rose married for the first time to ESPN personality Molly Qerim in a private ceremony. In 2021, he filed for divorce from Qerim. He stated that their marriage broke down after she moved to Connecticut. Rose has two daughters and a son from a previous relationship.

References

External links

1973 births
Living people
African-American basketball players
African-American Christians
African-American sports journalists
American Christians
All-American college men's basketball players
American expatriate basketball people in Canada
American men's basketball players
American philanthropists
American podcasters
Basketball players from Detroit
Chicago Bulls players
Denver Nuggets draft picks
Denver Nuggets players
ESPN people
Indiana Pacers players
McDonald's High School All-Americans
Michigan Wolverines men's basketball players
National Basketball Association broadcasters
New York Knicks players
Parade High School All-Americans (boys' basketball)
Phoenix Suns players
Point guards
Shooting guards
Small forwards
Southwestern High School (Michigan) alumni
Toronto Raptors players
University of Maryland Global Campus alumni